The mixed pairs BC4 boccia event at the 2012 Summer Paralympics was contested from 2 to 4 September at ExCeL London.

Group stage

Group A

Group B

Knockout stage

References 

 

Pairs BC4